Nebria schrenckii is a species of ground beetle in the Nebriinae family that is endemic to Kazakhstan.

References

schrenckii
Beetles described in 1843
Beetles of Asia
Endemic fauna of Kazakhstan